Ecuador Highway 5 (E5) is the westernmost trunk highway in Ecuador. The highway is known as the Insular Route, and it runs entirely within the Galápagos Islands. E5's northern terminus is on Baltra Island, at the Seymour Airport; its southern terminus on Santa Cruz Island, at El Garrapatero beach.

E5 is the only national highway in the Galápagos Islands and therefore does not intersect any other national highways along its route.

Route description 
The highway is carried by the ferry route to Santa Cruz Island. From Puerto Ayora, the highway runs eastward along the Via Playa El Garrapatero to the El Garrapatero beach.

005